Shiloh is the name of six places in the State of Tennessee in the United States of America:

Shiloh, Bedford County, Tennessee
Shiloh, Carroll County, Tennessee
Shiloh, Hardin County, Tennessee (location of Shiloh National Military Park)
Shiloh, Hawkins County, Tennessee
Shiloh, Montgomery County, Tennessee
Shiloh, Rutherford County, Tennessee